This is a list of fictional characters from DC Comics who are or have been enemies of the Teen Titans. In chronological order (with issue and date of first appearance).

See also
 List of Teen Titans (TV series) enemies
 List of Justice League enemies
 List of Batman enemies
 List of Superman enemies
 List of Wonder Woman enemies
 List of Flash enemies
 List of Aquaman enemies
 List of Martian Manhunter enemies
 List of Green Arrow enemies

References

External links
TitansTower.com

Enemies
 
Lists of DC Comics characters
Lists of DC Comics supervillains